Killdozer! is a 1974 made for TV science-fiction horror movie, adapted from a 1944 novella of the same name by Theodore Sturgeon. A comic book adaptation appeared the same year, in Marvel Comics' Worlds Unknown #6 (April 1974). The film has since gained a cult following.

Plot

A meteorite crashes onto the Earth's surface on an island off the coast of Africa. Countless years later, after natural forces have buried it and restored the local environment, six construction workers are boated to the island to begin work building an airstrip for an oil drilling company at the crash site on the uninhabited island.

Foreman Kelly (Clint Walker) and bulldozer driver Mack (Robert Urich) uncover the meteorite (though they do not know what it is), which emits a strange sound. When the bulldozer (a Caterpillar D9 in the movie, a Caterpillar D7 in the novella) is used to try to shift the meteorite, it emits a blue light that moves to, and seems to possess, the bulldozer. Mack, standing nearby as this occurs, falls ill and then dies some hours later. Chub (Neville Brand), the team's mechanic, cannot find anything wrong with the inoperative bulldozer, but can hear the odd sound from the blade. Kelly orders that the bulldozer not be used.

Beltran (James A. Watson Jr.) ignores the prohibition and starts the bulldozer, bringing it to malevolent life. It destroys the camp's only two-way radio and begins a rampage, killing the workers one by one. It seems to run indefinitely in spite of a limited fuel capacity. The machine has some rudimentary intelligence and guile and hunts down the men.

The crew is soon reduced to just Kelly and Dennis (Carl Betz). Running out of options, with the expected relief crew not due to arrive just yet, they amuse themselves by convicting the bulldozer of murder, then consider methods of "execution": it is too heavy to hang, and too big for the gas chamber. They then realize it might be able to be electrocuted. They lure it to a trap consisting of steel Marston Matting (used for constructing temporary runways during World War II) connected to a generator.

As the bulldozer is electrified, the alien entity emerges as an aura around the machine, then finally fades. The men shut down the power and check the blade: no sound. Though Kelly realizes his story will not be believed as he is a recovering alcoholic, and this job was his last chance to redeem himself, he intends to tell the truth.

Cast

 Clint Walker as Lloyd Kelly
 Carl Betz as Dennis Holvig
 Neville Brand as 'Chub' Foster
 James Wainwright as Jules 'Dutch' Krasner
 James A. Watson Jr. as Al Beltran
 Robert Urich as 'Mack' McCarthy

Release

Home media
Killdozer! was released for the first time on DVD by Willette Acquisition Corporation on July 1, 2021, and on blu-ray and DVD by Kino Lorber in 2020.

Reception

Killdozer! received mostly negative reviews upon its release, with criticism directed towards the film's 'outlandish' premise.
Charleston Picou from HorrorNews.net gave the film a mixed review, writing, "While the movie itself is well made for a ‘70s TV flick, with decent acting and directing, it’s ultimately undone by the overall ridiculousness. The titular killdozer is never really that frightening and is sometimes kind of silly looking." Regardless, Picou stated the film 'still manages to be entertaining'. Jon Condit from Dread Central panned the film, awarding the film a score of 0.5 out of 5. In his review, Condit criticized the film's ridiculous premise, sluggish pace, "one-dimensional" characters, and overall lack of suspense. Andrew Smith from the British film review website Popcorn Pictures gave the film a score of 0 out of 10, writing, "Killdozer is dreadful fare which should have been left to rust on the seventies scrap heap. It’s hard trying to find positives to say about it. Even its short running time drags out for an eternity."
However, not all reviews for the film were negative.
The Terror Trap rated the film a score of 2.5 out of 4 stars, stating that the film "comes off fairly well thanks to its straightforward, sci-fi approach", while also noting its strange premise.

Legacy

In spite of receiving largely negative reviews from both critics and audience members, Killdozer! has acquired a cult following over the years and is now considered a cult classic.

The rock band Killdozer was named after the film.

See also
 List of American films of 1974

References

External links
 
 
 

1974 films
1974 horror films
1974 television films
1970s science fiction horror films
ABC Movie of the Week
American horror television films
American science fiction horror films
American science fiction television films
Films based on American horror novels
Films based on short fiction
Films directed by Jerry London
Films set on uninhabited islands
Films scored by Gil Mellé
1970s English-language films
1970s American films